Minotola is an unincorporated community located within Buena Borough, in Atlantic County, New Jersey, United States.

The Minotola Post Office was founded by John H. Sims in 1897.

Education 
Minotola is part of the Buena Regional School District, which serves Buena Borough as well as the communities of Buena Vista Township, Weymouth Township, and Estell Manor. Schools located within Minotola include Dr. J.P. Cleary Elementary School, and Notre Dame Regional parochial school, both located on Central Avenue.

References

Buena, New Jersey
1897 establishments in New Jersey
Populated places established in 1897
Unincorporated communities in Atlantic County, New Jersey
Unincorporated communities in New Jersey